Gholam Hossein Mazloumi (13 January 1950 – 19 November 2014), nicknamed Sar Talaei ("Golden Head"), was an Iranian football player, coach and football administrator.

He played for three clubs including Taj Abadan, Taj Tehran (Esteghlal), and Shahbaz FC, as well as the Iranian national team and the national youth team of Iran. He also managed Esteghlal from 1988 to 1989. During his time as a football player, he scored 37 goals for the Iran national football team and was Iran's all-time top scorer for twelve years before his record being broken by Ali Daei. He was the top scorer at the 1974 Asian Games and the 1976 AFC Asian Cup.

He was chairman of Shahin Bushehr from 2011 until 2013 and also honorary deputy chairman of Esteghlal. He died on 19 November 2014 after being diagnosed with stomach cancer two years earlier.

Honours

Club
Iran Football League: 1970 , 1975
Tehran Football League: 1971 , 1972
AFC Champions League: 1970

National
AFC Asian Cup: 1972 , 1976
Asian Games: 1974

Individuals
Iran Football League Golden Boot: 1974 , 1975 , 1977
AFC Champions League top goalscorer: 1970
AFC Asian Cup top goalscorer: 1976
Asian Games top goalscorer: 1974
AFC Champions League Player of the Tournament: 1970
Asian Games Player of the Tournament: 1974
Asian Striker of the Year: 1974
AFC U-20 Asian Cup top goalscorer: 1969

Early life
Gholam Hossein Mazloumi was born on 13 January 1950 in Abadan, Iran. He had two sisters and six brothers. One of them, Parviz, also became a professional football player and coach.

Club career
Mazloumi was one of the key players of Taj Tehran. He won the Asian Club Championship in the 1969–70 season, as well as the Iranian league in 1970–71 and 1974–75, and he reached the second place in 1973–74. Mazloumi is considered to be one of the finest strikers in Iranian football history as evidenced by total goal tally for the national team scoring the most goals in the fewest caps. Mazloumi was a great finisher, rarely missing sure-goal opportunities.

In this period he became the Iranian league's top goalscorer in two consecutive seasons of 1973–74 and 1974–75. He was the top goalscorer again in the 1976–77 season when he was playing as one of the key players for Shahbaz reaching the third place in that season. He retired in 1978 at the age of 28 due to an injury.

International career
Mazloumi made his debut for the Iran national team in September 1969 in a match against Pakistan. He has a total of 40 caps and 19 goals for Team Melli.

Mazloumi won three major tournaments with the Iran national team, including the 1972 Asian Cup, the football tournament of the 1974 Asian Games in Tehran as well as the 1976 Asian Cup in Tehran as one of the top scorers. He also participated in the 1976 Olympics in Montreal, when Iran reached the quarterfinals.

Career statistics

International goals 
Scores and results list Iran's goal tally first, score column indicates score after each Mazloumi goal.

Post-playing career
After he retired, he became head coach of Esteghlal's youth team in 1980. In 1988, he was promoted as first team manager, replacing Abbas Razavi. Esteghlal finished third in Mazloumi's first season in charge. He left the club after playing two games in his second season and was replaced with Mansour Pourheidari. He later managed Iran national under-20 football team, Esteghlal Ahvaz, Moghavemat Tehran, Petrochimi Mahshahr and Payam Tehran.

He later became team manager of Esteghlal. He was elected as chairman of Shahin Bushehr on 24 July 2011 but resigned on 20 July 2013 due to his illness. He was diagnosed with stomach cancer in 2012 and died on 19 November 2014 in Naja Hospital in Tehran. He was 64 and was deputy chairman of Esteghlal at the time of his death. Mazloumi is survived by his wife, four children and three grandchildren.

References

External links

Gholam Hossein Mazloumi at TeamMelli.com

1950 births
2014 deaths
Iranian footballers
Association football forwards
Iran international footballers
Esteghlal F.C. players
Esteghlal F.C. managers
1972 AFC Asian Cup players
1976 AFC Asian Cup players
Footballers at the 1976 Summer Olympics
AFC Asian Cup-winning players
Olympic footballers of Iran
People from Abadan, Iran
Asian Games gold medalists for Iran
Asian Games medalists in football
Footballers at the 1974 Asian Games
Medalists at the 1974 Asian Games
Iranian football managers
Deaths from cancer in Iran
Deaths from stomach cancer
Sportspeople from Khuzestan province